Molla Ali, better known as Qazi Ardaghi was an Iranian cleric, judge and revolutionary figure.

Life 
He was one of the 12 prominent followers of Jamal al-Din Asadabadi who joined him during the latter's time in sanctuary in the Shah Abdol-Azim Shrine. He then travelled to Karbala and Najaf and after completing his education, returned to Iran during the last years of the reign of Mozaffar ad-Din Shah Qajar.

Molla Ali moved from Qazvin to Tehran in the early days of the constitutional era and joined the judiciary, which gave him the nickname Qazi Ardaghi, "The Ardaghi Judge". As a judge, he severely punished many of the preparators of the  acquitted the people accused of plotting the failed assassination attempt on the Shah. Due to his anti Shah positions, he was one of the seven people who the Shah demanded the parliament to be arrested, which was refused by the parliament.

After  and Mirza Jahangir Khan Sur Esrafil, Qazi Ardaghi was the third person to be killed.

References 

People of the Persian Constitutional Revolution
People from Qazvin Province
1908 deaths